The Medicine Hat Tigers are a junior ice hockey team in the Western Hockey League (WHL) who play in Medicine Hat, Alberta, Canada.  Established in 1970, the team has won two national Memorial Cups, five WHL League Championships and seven Division Titles, and continues to rally for the Cup annually.  Starting in the 2015–16 season, the Tigers have begun play at Co-op Place after forty-five seasons at the Medicine Hat Arena.  They had a sell-out streak at The Arena dating back 197 games (as of May 15, 2007).

The Tigers lost the 2007 Memorial Cup championship game 3–1 on May 27, 2007, against the Vancouver Giants, which was hosted by Vancouver at the Pacific Coliseum. This was after beating the Giants in double overtime in Game 7 of the WHL Finals two weeks earlier.

Season-by-season record
Note: GP = Games played, W = Wins, L = Losses, T = Ties, OTL = Overtime losses, Pts = Points, GF = Goals for, GA = Goals against

WHL Championship history
1972–73: Win, 3-0-2 vs Saskatoon
1985–86: Loss, 1-4 vs Kamloops
1986–87: Win, 4-3 vs Portland
1987–88: Win, 4-2 vs Kamloops
2003–04: Win, 4-0 vs Everett
2006–07: Win, 4-3 vs Vancouver

Team records

Players

Current roster
Updated January 24, 2023.

 

 

  
  

 

   
  
 

 

 
 

 

 

|}

NHL alumni

See also
List of ice hockey teams in Alberta

References

External links
Official site

Ice hockey teams in Alberta
Sport in Medicine Hat
Ice hockey clubs established in 1970
Western Hockey League teams
1970 establishments in Alberta